Papyrus 71 (in the Gregory-Aland numbering), designated by 𝔓71, is an early copy of the New Testament in Greek. It is a papyrus manuscript of the Gospel of Matthew. The surviving texts of Matthew are verses 19:10-11.17-18. 
The manuscript paleographically had been assigned to the 4th century.

 Text 
The Greek text of this codex is a representative of the Alexandrian text-type. Aland placed it in Category II.

 Present location 
It is currently housed at the Ashmolean Museum (P. Oxy. 2385) in Oxford.

See also 

 List of New Testament papyri
 Oxyrhynchus Papyri

References

Images 
 P. Oxy. XXIV Oxyrhynchus 2385 Oxyrhynchus Online 
 𝔓71 recto Matt. 19:10-11 
 𝔓71 verso Matt. 19:17-18

Further reading 

 Edgar Lobel, Colin H. Roberts, E. G. Turner, and J. W. B. Barns, Oxyrhynchus Papyri, XXIV (London: 1957), pp. 5–6.

New Testament papyri
4th-century biblical manuscripts
Gospel of Matthew papyri